The East Texas Council of Governments is a voluntary association of cities, counties and special districts in East Texas.

Based in Kilgore, the East Texas Council of Governments is a member of the Texas Association of Regional Councils.

Counties served

Largest cities in the region

Other member agencies
Cherokee County Soil and Water Conservation District
Harrison County Soil and Water Conservation District
Upshur-Gregg Soil and Water Conservation District
Wood County Soil and Water Conservation District
Upper Neches River Municipal Water Authority 
Sabine River Authority 
Trinity River Authority 
East Cedar Creek Fresh Water Supply District 
9-1-1 Network of East Texas 
Trinity Valley Community College 
Kilgore College 
Tyler Junior College 
Trinity-Neces Soil and Water Conservation District 
Panola College

References

External links
East Texas Council of Governments - Official site

Texas Association of Regional Councils